Club de Regatas Vasco da Gama, commonly known as Vasco da Gama or simply Vasco, is a women's association football club based in Rio de Janeiro, Brazil. Founded in 1987, the team has been inactive for periods prior to its most recent reinstatement in 2016. The team is affiliated with Federação de Futebol do Estado do Rio de Janeiro and play their home games at São Januário. The team colors, reflected in their logo and uniform, are white and black. They play in the third tier of women's football in Brazil, the Campeonato Brasileiro de Futebol Feminino Série A3, and in the Campeonato Carioca de Futebol Feminino, the traditional in-state competition.

History
A Vasco women's team was founded in 1987 and signed professional players including Cenira. They competed in the Campeonato Carioca de Futebol Feminino for the first time that year, finishing last of six teams. In 1988 they improved to finish runners-up to the dominant EC Radar team of the era.

In the 1990s Vasco's women's team enjoyed the patronage of the club's influential director Eurico Miranda and enjoyed sustained success. Coach Helena Pacheco assembled a strong team with several national team players and also set up a thriving residential youth system at the São Januário stadium. When the Campeonato Carioca was re-instated in 1996, Vasco won it five times in succession. They won four national titles (1993, 1994, 1995 and 1998) and in 2000 signed a 14-year-old Marta to their youth team. The entire women's section was disbanded for financial reasons in 2002.

Vasco entered the 2007 Copa do Brasil de Futebol Feminino but, when negotiations to partner with Saad Esporte Clube failed, team coach Marisa Pires Nogueira had only 15 days to prepare her young and inexperienced team for the competition. They were heavily beaten by Benfica (who had partnered with CEPE-Caxias) in the opening round. 

In 2010 Vasco made an agreement with the Brazilian Navy to run a women's football team in partnership with them. It was intended to help prepare the Navy team to function as the Brazil women's military national football team in the Football at the Military World Games competition at the 2011 Military World Games, hosted in Rio de Janeiro.

After another period of inactivity, an adult women's team was relaunched again in 2016. The experienced former national team player Ester was signed to provide guidance to the younger players.

Stadium
Although Vasco's women's team host some matches at São Januário, they also play at the smaller Estádio Nivaldo Pereira in nearby Nova Iguaçu.

Players

Vasco provided 10 players to Brazil's squad for the 1995 South American Women's Football Championship in Uberlândia. By the 1999 FIFA Women's World Cup, Vasco's Pretinha and Fanta were the only players in the 20-strong squad who were not contracted to a club in São Paulo.

Former players
For details of current and former players with a Wikipedia article, see :Category:CR Vasco da Gama (women) players.

References

Women's team
Association football clubs established in 1987
Women's football clubs in Brazil
1987 establishments in Brazil
Football clubs in Rio de Janeiro (state)
Football clubs in Rio de Janeiro (city)